North Shore Country Club is a private country club in Glenview, Illinois, a suburb of Chicago.

Founded in 1900, it features a 7,031 yard 18-hole golf course.  In 1933, it hosted the U.S. Open that was won by Johnny Goodman. It has also hosted the Western Open once and the U.S. Amateur twice. It was host site of the Encompass Championship on the Champions Tour from 2013 to 2015.

The course was designed by English architect Charles Allison of Colt MacKenzie and Alison.

References

External links
 Home page

Glenview, Illinois
Golf clubs and courses in Illinois
Golf clubs and courses designed by Harry Colt
Sports venues in Cook County, Illinois
1900 establishments in Illinois
Companies based in Glenview, Illinois
Sports venues completed in 1900